Ljusdals IP is a sports venue in Ljusdal. It is the home of Ljusdals BK and was the Bandy World Cup venue until 2008, when the tournament moved indoors.

References

Bandy venues in Sweden
Sport in Ljusdal